Hamamelididae is an obsolete botanical name at the rank of subclass.
Because some hamamelidid members bear aments (i.e., catkins), this subclass has been formerly known as Amentiferae. Based on molecular phylogeny works, Hamamelididae appears to be a polyphyletic group.

A well-known system that used the name Hamamelididae is the Cronquist system, although in the disallowed spelling Hamamelidae. In the original 1981 version of this system the circumscription was:

 subclass Hamamelidae
 order Trochodendrales
 order Hamamelidales
 order Daphniphyllales
 order Didymelales
 order Eucommiales
 order Urticales
 order Leitneriales
 order Juglandales
 order Myricales
 order Fagales
 order Casuarinales

As is true for any botanical name, circumscription of the subclass will vary with the taxonomic system being used; the only requirement being that it includes the family Hamamelidaceae. The APG II system does not recognize named taxa above the rank of order but places most of the taxa involved in the rosids clade, with Hamamelidaceae itself in order Saxifragales.

References 

Historically recognized angiosperm taxa
Plant subclasses